Reginald Ford Sparkes (June 27, 1906 – January 1990) was an educator, writer and political figure in Newfoundland. He represented St. Barbe in the Newfoundland and Labrador House of Assembly from 1949 to 1956. Sparkes was the first speaker for the House of Assembly after Newfoundland became part of Canada.

Biography
He was born in Jackson's Arm, Newfoundland Colony the son of Isaac Sparkes and Roseanna Ford, and was educated there, at Bishop Feild College and Columbia University. He taught in Trinity Bay and Change Islands. In 1936, he became a supervisor inspector for west coast schools in Newfoundland. Sparkes married Hannah Bugden. He retired from politics in 1956 and became manager of the Newfoundland Savings Bank, later taken over by the Bank of Montreal. In 1967, he retired to Hallstown, North River. He died in 1990.

Publications
 The Winds Softly Sigh published in 1981 
Sense and Nonsense published in 1989 , selections from his weekly column written under the name Jonathan Miles, A Countryman's Notebook

References 
 

Speakers of the Newfoundland and Labrador House of Assembly
Writers from Newfoundland and Labrador
1906 births
1990 deaths
Canadian educators
Bishop Feild School alumni